Ternopil Lake (Ukrainian: Тернопільський став, known as Komsomol Lake before 1992, non-official Ternopil Lake) is a large artificial pond, a reservoir set in the center of Ternopil created in the place of swamps on the river Seret. Today Ternopil pond is surrounded by a park. It is a favorite walking place of residents and visitors of the city. Only two European cities have the lake in the center and one of them is Ternopil. On the embankment of the Ternopil Lake takes place the festival of forge art. The Church of Exaltation of the Cross which is the architectural monument of the 16th century is situated near the lake.

History
It was created in 1548 by Crown Hetman Jan Tarnowski as one link in a chain of fortifications encircling his residence, the Tarnopol Castle. In the 16th century the pond stretched for  up to the high dam carrying the Lwów Highway. At the beginning of the 20th century, the pond was leased by Ternopil businessman Volodymyr Trach, who exported fish to Poland.

In addition it was also used for fish breeding. The pond, formerly renowned for its fisheries, had silted up by the mid-20th century and was further damaged during the Second World War. During the Second World War, Ternopil pond was completely destroyed. It was reconstructed and expanded in 1952 to include a network of marshes bordering the Seret River during the massive rebuilding of Ternopil. At that time, it was decided to transfer the water resources to the local authorities in 1956, which began to recover the Ternopil pond. A new dam was built resulting in a higher water level than before. The mended pond had taken a much larger area - more than 300 hectares, and was subsequently named as Komsomol lake. Shevchenko Park was established between the pond and the city center in 1953, which stretched along the eastern shores of the lake. In the 1960s, the beach near the Old Castle was eliminated and in its place a central pier was built. A local version of the Jet d'Eau was inaugurated in 1975. In the 1980s the landscaping around the Komsomolsk lake continued to be developed. A hydropark "Pioneer" behind the dam was created, which later was renamed as "Topilche." Hotel "Moscow" was also built at the foot of the Forest Park "Zahrebellia". Subsequently, the hotel's name was changed to "Halychyna". Also, Ternopil pond has two islands: the Island of Love and "The Seagull" (“Chaika”).

An old Soviet motor ship, "Yan Amor Tarnovskyi" (former name "The Hero Tantsorov") still operating on the pond. In 1968, the ship appeared in Ternopil named in honor of Gregory Tantsorov - one of the liberators of the city from German occupation. The ship originally was called "Zalishchyky" and was built in 1963 in Belarus. The overhaul of "The Hero Tantsorov"  was made in 2006. In 1966 a small motor ship "PT-50" appeared on the pond ("Passenger ship - Fifty Project"), built in 1964. In 2005, the two ships were passed to the ownership of municipal enterprise “Ternopilelektrotrans”.

The pond has significant economic importance in the 21st century, operating four mills that bring profits to the city.  There are a lot of fish in the lake such as pike, perch, carp, and others. There are also a lot of algae and the yellow water lily that blooms in late June. To the west of the pond near the village Pronyatyn, various types of willows are existent. Also, wild ducks and gulls swim and breed in Ternopil pond.

Photogallery

References

External links 
 

Reservoirs in Ukraine
Parks in Ternopil
Ponds of Europe
1548 establishments in Poland
16th-century establishments in Ukraine
Geography of Ternopil